VED or Ved may refer to:

 Vehicle Excise Duty, paid to acquire a vehicle licence in UK
 Vedas, a Hindu religious text
 Vacuum Erection Device, a treatment for erectile dysfunction
 Visual Enunciation Display, a Telecommunications device for the deaf
 Ved, a character from The Tribe 1999 TV series', a post-apocalyptic teen drama 
 Ved (mythology), hairy humanoid in south Slavic mythology
 VEd – design shear force according to Eurocodes
 Ved, a 2022 Marathi language film

People
Lea Ved, American dancer and choreographer